Christopher-John Banda (10 July 1974 in Blantyre, Malawi – 6 September 2009) was a Malawian footballer.

Club career
 1996-01: MTL Wanderers
 2001-03: Big Bullets
 2003-09: Kuchekuche Stars

International career
A longtime member of the Malawi national football team, Banda has competed for his national team from 1996 and played his last three games in 2009. His last international game, two days before his death, was against Guinea national football team.

Death
He collapsed in the game from his club Kuchekuche Stars against Man Tour in a qualifying game for Standard Bank Fam Cup and died later at Kamuzu Central Hospital in Lilongwe.

References

1974 births
2009 deaths
People from Blantyre
Malawian footballers
Malawi international footballers
Mighty Wanderers FC players

Association football midfielders
Nyasa Big Bullets FC players